Pedro José de Fonte y Hernández Miravete (13 March 1777, Linares de Mora, Teruel–11 June 1839, Madrid) was Archbishop of Mexico from 1815 to 1837.

He was the last Spaniard to hold the post, his period in office was when Mexico achieved its independence from Spain.

He crowned the first Emperor of Mexico, Agustín de Iturbide, and the Empress Ana María de Huarte y Muñiz.

He was also a member of the regency council of Maria Christina of the Two Sicilies during the minority of Isabella II of Spain.

References 
Catholic-hierarchy website
Circular del ilustrisimo señor arzobispo electo, y gobernador de esta diocesis a los curas y ministros de las parroquias de ella. ; Mexico, 1815. (OCLC 24064261)
Don Pedro José de Fonte por la gracia de dios y de la santa silla apostólica, Arzobispo de México &c. : al venerable clero secular y regular de esta diócesis. ; México : 1821. (OCLC 19668152)
Carta pastoral, que a continuacion de otra del santísimo padre el Señor Pio Vii. dirige á sus diocesanos el arzobispo de México. ; Mexico : Impresa em la oficina de D. Alexandro Valdés, año de 1816. (OCLC 26106497)
Representacion del ilmo. sr. arzobispo de Mejico concerniente a algunos sucesos anteriores a la independencia proclamada en aquella capital. ; Habana, Impreso por Campe en la Oficina liberal, 1822. (OCLC 20029140)

Roman Catholic archbishops of Mexico (city)
1777 births
1839 deaths
People from the Province of Teruel